Elmstead is a village and civil parish in the Tendring district, in the English county of Essex. In 2001 the population of the civil parish of Elmstead was 1,898, decreasing to 1,855 at the 2011 Census.

Parish Church of St Anne and St Lawrence 
The Church of England parish church is dedicated to Saint Anne, the mother of the Virgin Mary and Saint Lawrence of Rome, a leader of the Early Church and a martyr. The main parts of the church have been dated to around 1310; a South Chapel was added about 20 years later. The early 14th-century tower only rises one and a half storeys and was never completed. The south wall of the chancel has a squint or "leper window"; these were popularly supposed to have been used by people infected by leprosy to receive Holy Communion; however, their exact purpose is unknown. On the sill of East window, there is an oak effigy of knight in chainmail armour with a pointed bascinet helmet, perhaps depicting Lawrence de Tany, who died in 1317. The Church provides Sunday Services and a children's Sunday School, and is available for use as a wedding venue. The listed building is surrounded by a small cemetery.

Nearby settlements 
Nearby settlements include the towns of Colchester and Wivenhoe and the villages of Alresford and Elmstead Market.

Transport 
For transport there is the A120 road and the A133 road nearby.

References 

 A-Z Essex (page 167)

External links
 Elmstead Parish Council

Villages in Essex
Civil parishes in Essex
Tendring